= Ada Cóncaro =

- Born: 1934; Buenos Aires, Argentina
- Died: 14 December 2010 (aged 75–76); Buenos Aires
- Occupation: Cook

Ada Cóncaro (1934 - 14 December 2010) was an Argentine chef and gourmet of Italian heritage.

Cóncaro was born in Buenos Aires and studied chemistry at the University of Buenos Aires. She was a professor of mathematics in Patagonia before returning to Buenos Aires. In 1983 she founded the Tomo I restaurant in Buenos Aires, which became one of the most important gastronomic institutions in Argentina. She gave birth to three children, and left Tomo I to her son, Federico Fialayre. She died in Buenos Aires.
